Nathan Monzango (born 18 April 2001) is a French professional footballer who plays as a defender for  club Pau FC.

Career

Amiens SC 
Monzango made his professional debut with Amiens in a 1–0 Ligue 2 win over Nancy on 22 August 2020.

On 8 September 2021, he joined Turkish club Çaykur Rizespor on loan. On 4 February 2022, Çaykur Rizespor terminated the loan after Monzango made only one cup appearance for the club up to that point.

Pau FC 
Monzago joined Pau FC in Ligue 2 in 2022 for the next two seasons.

References

External links
 
 

2001 births
Footballers from Kinshasa
French people of Democratic Republic of the Congo descent
Democratic Republic of the Congo emigrants to France
Living people
French footballers
Association football defenders
Amiens SC players
Çaykur Rizespor footballers
Pau FC players
Ligue 2 players
Championnat National 3 players
French expatriate footballers
French expatriate sportspeople in Turkey
Expatriate footballers in Turkey